Khai Bua Ban was a king of Lan Xang, ruling from 1433 until 1436. At the time of his succession, he was governor of Chiengkai. Khai Bua Ban's reign ended after Nang Keo Phimpha ordered his death.

References

Kings of Lan Xang
Year of birth unknown
15th-century deaths
15th-century Laotian people
15th-century monarchs in Asia
Laotian Theravada Buddhists